Andrew Seras (born December 4, 1962) is an American wrestler. He competed in the men's Greco-Roman 68 kg at the 1988 Summer Olympics.

References

External links
 

1962 births
Living people
American male sport wrestlers
Olympic wrestlers of the United States
Wrestlers at the 1988 Summer Olympics
Sportspeople from New York City
Pan American Games medalists in wrestling
Pan American Games gold medalists for the United States
Pan American Games silver medalists for the United States
Wrestlers at the 1991 Pan American Games
Wrestlers at the 1995 Pan American Games
Medalists at the 1991 Pan American Games
Medalists at the 1995 Pan American Games